Proto-oncogene tyrosine-protein kinase MER is an enzyme that in humans is encoded by the MERTK gene.

Function 

This gene is a member of the TYRO3/AXL/MER (TAM) receptor kinase family and encodes a transmembrane protein with two fibronectin type-III domains, two Ig-like C2-type (immunoglobulin-like) domains, and one tyrosine kinase domain. Mutations in this gene have been associated with disruption of the retinal pigment epithelium (RPE) phagocytosis pathway and onset of autosomal recessive retinitis pigmentosa (RP).

References

Further reading

External links 
  GeneReviews/NCBI/NIH/UW entry on Retinitis Pigmentosa Overview
 

Tyrosine kinase receptors